Death on a Galician Shore (La playa de los ahogados) is a detective fiction novel by Domingo Villar published by Agencia Literaria in 2009. In 2011, the novel was published in Great Britain by Abacus and translated by Sonia Soto; that year it was shortlisted for the Crime Writers' Association's International Dagger Award.

Plot

Police Investigator Leo Caldas of the Vigo Police Department has been called to the town of Panxon to check on a body of a sailor who has washed up on the northwest shore of Spain.  Believed to be a suicide by the townspeople, Caldas is not sure.  With help from forensic pathologists, murder is determined.  Who and why are the questions Caldas is now concerning himself.  While working on the death of the sailor, Caldas learns about a murder ten years ago that could be connected.  Caldas is a character dealing with his own problems—the loss of his mother, the new life of his father, a sick uncle, and longing for a former girlfriend.

Background

Domingo Villar (6 March 1971 – 18 May 2022), a Spanish crime writer, was born in Vigo, and lived in Madrid, Spain. This is Villar's second book featuring Inspector Leo Caldas. The others are "The last boat" (El último barco) and "Water blue eyes" (Ojos de agua).

Characters

Inspector Leo Caldas—main character
Assistant Rafael Estevez—first from Vigo Police to arrive at site of the victim
Captain Sousa—Captain of ship that sank ten years ago
Marcos Valverde
Irene Vazquez—Neighbor to Rebeca Naira
Ernesto Hermia & Wife—Fisherman and wife (eyewitness to fisherman that is found dead)
Justo Castello—Sailor that is washed up on the shore
Rebeca Naira—Female killed ten years earlier
Diego Naira—Son of Rebeca Naira

Literary significance and reception
In this book, Villar tells the story of a close-knit town on the northwest of Spain, where fisherman return to the water Monday-Saturday to fill their nets and sell their catches.  Food is also an important feature to the story. The culture of the people, including their food, plays an important role in the story.

In Maxine Scott's review of the book, she states that this is not a "complicated" book, and it was not necessary to have a multiple number of bodies to enhance the story.

References

General sources:

http://www.eurocrime.co.uk/reviews/Death_on_a_Galician_Shore.html
http://www.austcrimefiction.org/review/death-galician-shore-domingo-villar
https://www.goodreads.com/review/show/668583400

Detective novels
Spanish crime novels
2009 novels